The Lancia Diàlogos is an Italian luxury concept car that was presented in saloon form at the 1998 Turin Motor Show. 

Under development since August 1996, the Diàlogos was designed by the company's in-house Centro Stile Lancia under chief designer, Mike Robinson, who described the concept as "a futuristic design, a next-generation car, with a flavor of the past". Distinctive body features include front styling dominated by a large grille, and the absence of side central pillars with the rear doors opening backwards, to evoke the design of the Lancia Aurelia saloon of the 1950s.The interior is sumptuously appointed with body-moulding seats trimmed in "nabuk", said to be similar to chamois leather. In addition, the front seats of the Diàlogos swivel through 90° to help access into the cabin, and by 180° to form a sofa facing the rear seats. Other interior features includes: a steering wheel and instrument panel located at the centre for ease of access but that can slide on either side depending on the prevailing driving direction; 2 screens fitted in the back of the front seats; a tactile thin film of softwood bonded to a layer of resin and foam for the dashboard and some other areas; a personal electronic key, known as the "Ego Card", which allows the car to adapt to an individual's needs associated with seat position, multi-zone climate control settings, steering-wheel and pedal position; automatically opening driver's door upon approaching the car. 

Mechanically, although not equipped with an engine, the Diàlogos is said to feature an active differential and adjustable drive-torque distribution to both axles as well as advanced multilink suspensions. For example, the front suspension uses a virtual steering axis, with the said axis passing through the center of the front wheels thus claimed to result in potholes or uneven surfaces not causing the wheel to vibrate or turn. The rear suspension too uses a virtual pitch center such that, when riding over an obstacle, the wheel moves back to reduce interference transmitted to the body.

In terms of driving technologies the Diàlogos has: fully adaptive headlights that respond to driving conditions; adaptive cruise control; adaptive semi-automatic transmission; anti-collision and lane departure systems; voice control for many systems; exterior cameras. 

Lancia later adapted and introduced many of the above technologies for mass production, on its Lancia Thesis saloon, which was launched in 2001 and whose exterior styling was based on that of the Diàlogos.

Although a wagon concept was also designed, it was never produced to full scale.

Lancia Giubileo
In 2000, a one-off version named Giubileo was built and gifted to Pope John Paul II as part of the Catholic church's Great Jubilee celebrations. It was powered by a 3.0L Alfa Romeo V6 engine and was valued at 1.5 million.

References

Diàlogos